Sumanth Shailendra (born 7 September 1988) is an Indian actor working in Kannada and Telugu language films. He made his acting debut in the 2011 film Aata and got a good break through from the film Dilwala (2013) which brought him much appreciation and popularity. He is the son of popular Kannada film producer Shailendra Babu.

Career
Sumanth debuted in films with the 2011 film, Aata which was produced by his father and directed by Vijayakumar. The film featured him as a football player from a middle class family. His portrayal of Rahul as the male lead opposite Vibha Natarajan, was not received well among the critics who found the film's plot and his performance to be disappointing. Following this negative response, Sumanth underwent a rigorous training in acting at the Kishore Namith School of Acting and signed his second venture titled Dilwala starring opposite Radhika Pandit. The film received positive reviews from critics with his performance being lauded and citing that a new star to be born in Kannada cinema. The film turned out to be a huge commercial hit at the box-office.

Following this, Sumanth starred in a comedy entertainer Tirupathi Express (2014) alongside actress Kriti Kharbanda. This was a remake of Telugu hit film Venkatadri Express (2013). The film met with an average review from the critics.

Filmography
All films are in Kannada, unless otherwise noted.

References

External links 

1988 births
Living people
Male actors from Bangalore
Male actors in Kannada cinema
Indian male film actors
21st-century Indian male actors
Male actors in Telugu cinema